Kanishk Seth (born 4 November 1997) is an Indian cricketer. He plays Twenty20 cricket for Railways. He made his List A debut for Bengal in the 2016–17 Vijay Hazare Trophy on 28 February 2017. He made his first-class debut for Bengal in the 2017–18 Ranji Trophy on 6 October 2017. In January 2018, he was bought by the Chennai Super Kings in the 2018 IPL auction.

See also
 List of Bengal cricketers

References

External links
 

1997 births
Living people
Indian cricketers
Bengal cricketers
Cricketers from Kolkata